Mill Hill East is a London Underground station in Mill Hill in the London Borough of Barnet, north London. The station is the terminus and only station of a single-track branch of the Northern line from Finchley Central station and is in Travelcard Zone 4.

The station was opened in 1867 as part of the Great Northern Railway's line between Finsbury Park and Edgware stations. As part of London Underground's partially completed Northern Heights plan, main line passenger services ended in 1939 and Northern line trains started serving the station in 1941.

History

Main line

Mill Hill East station was built by the Edgware, Highgate and London Railway (EH&LR) on its line from Finsbury Park station to Edgware station.  Before the line was opened it was purchased in July 1867 by the larger Great Northern Railway (GNR), whose main line from King's Cross ran through Finsbury Park on its way to Potters Bar and the north. The station, originally named Mill Hill, opened along with the railway to Edgware on 22 August 1867 in what was then rural Middlesex.

The line was built as a double track formation, but only a single track was laid, with the intention of doubling the track when traffic developed. When the GNR opened a branch from Finchley Central to High Barnet in April 1872, traffic on that section was greater and the second track between Finchley Central and Edgware was never laid. For most of its history the service between those two stations was operated as a shuttle.

After the 1921 Railways Act created the Big Four railway companies, the GNR became part of the London and North Eastern Railway (LNER) in 1923. The station was given its present name on 1 March 1928.

Northern Heights project
In 1935, the London Passenger Transport Board (LPTB) announced a proposal, which became known as the Northern Heights project, to take over the LNER lines from Finsbury Park to Edgware, High Barnet and Alexandra Palace, and link them to both the Northern line at East Finchley and to the Northern City Line at Finsbury Park. Reconstruction of the line from Finchley Central to Edgware with double tracks began in 1938. The line and Mill Hill East station were closed for electrification on 11 September 1939.

Following the outbreak of the Second World War on 3 September 1939, completion of the works on the line was slowed. In order to provide a service to the nearby Inglis Barracks, works continued between Finchley Central and Mill Hill East. The station re-opened with electric Northern line services on 18 May 1941. The planned second platform at Mill Hill East was not built and the service continued to operate over the single track line as before.

Post-war
After the war, plans to complete the Northern Heights project were reviewed but no work was carried out. Maintenance works and reconstruction of war damage on the existing network had the greatest call on London Underground funds. Funds for new works were severely limited and priority was given to the completion of the western and eastern extensions of the Central line to West Ruislip, Ongar and Hainault. Despite being shown as under construction on underground maps as late as 1950, work never restarted on the unimplemented parts of the Northern Heights project.

British Railways (the successor to the LNER) freight trains continued to serve the station's goods yard until 1 October 1962, when it was closed. The site of the yard is now a business park.

As one of two EH&LR stations retaining their original buildings (with Finchley Central), it is one of the oldest parts of the Underground system, pre-dating the first tunnelled section of the Northern line (the City and South London Railway) by more than twenty years.

Today

Refurbishment of the station was carried out and completed in 2007. The works included structural repairs to the station and platforms, the re-decoration and re-tiling of walls and floors, a new public address system, as well as CCTV cameras and Help Points.

The station was made accessible in 2020 by means of a new lift and link bridge, which was prefabricated off site, and craned into position in August 2019. The lift finally opened in February 2020, becoming the Underground's 79th step-free station.

Services
The station is in Travelcard Zone 4.

 the Northern line service was a shuttle on the single track between Finchley Central and Mill Hill East, with the exception of peak-hour services. Direct weekend trains were discontinued on 20 May 2007.  direct peak times trains operated to either Kennington (via Charing Cross) or Morden (via Bank).

Train frequencies vary throughout the day, but are generally every 11–15 minutes between 05:44 and 00:56 to Finchley Central, Kennington or East Finchley. During peak times train services are extended to Morden.

Direct services to Nine Elms and Battersea Power Station run for most of the day (without the need to change at Finchley Central).

Connections
London Bus routes 221, 240 and 382 serve the station.

Mill Hill East also serves Saracens F.C. on match-days when shuttle buses run from the station to a short walking distance from their stadium, Allianz Park.

Notes and references

Notes

References

Bibliography

External links

Station information from Transport for London
 Mill Hill station in 1944.

Northern line stations
Tube stations in the London Borough of Barnet
Single platform tube stations
Former Great Northern Railway stations
Railway stations in Great Britain opened in 1867
Railway stations in Great Britain closed in 1939
Railway stations in Great Britain opened in 1941
Mill Hill